Legio II Isaura was a pseudocomitatensis Roman legion, levied no later than under Diocletian, and possibly already present under Probus. As their name suggests, II Isaura and its twin legion III Isaura were guarding the Isauria territory at the time of the Notitia Dignitatum, to defend it from the incursions of the mountain peoples. It is possible that in the beginning they were supported by I Isaura Sagittaria. According to Ammianus Marcellinus, in 360, they were stationed in Bezabde with II Armeniaca, and II Parthica, when the king of Persia, Shapur II besieged and conquered the city, killing many of the inhabitants.

See also
List of Roman legions

References and external links 
 Ritterling's "Legio", through romanarmy.com
 livius.org account
 Guimarães Bernardo, Isaura, 1986, J'ai Lu, Paris
 Legion of Mary, LEGIO MARIAE: The Official Handbook of the Legion of Mary, 1985, Concilium Legionis Mariae, Ireland
 Blatty, William Peter, My Naam is Legio, 1983, (Cape Town: Tafelberg, 1983) 0624019896
 Legio Mariae. The Official Handbook of the Legion of Mary, 1975, Concilium Legionis Mariae, Dublin
 Legio Mariae, 1953, Concilium Legionis Mariae
 Legio Mariae : The Official Handbook of the Legion of Mary, 1962, Cahill & Co., Ireland
 Moran, Legio Mariae: The Official Handbook of the Legion of Mary, 1993, Concillium Legionis Marie, Dublin Ireland

02 Isaura
Isauria
Military units and formations established in the 3rd century